Club Atlético Belgrano (mostly known simply as Belgrano  or Belgrano de Córdoba ) is an Argentine sports club from the city of Córdoba, best known for its football team. In the 2023 season the club will play in the Primera División, the first level of Argentine football league system, after being promoted from the 2022 Primera Nacional. Belgrano's stadium is called Julio César Villagra and is also known as El Gigante de Alberdi; it is located in Barrio Alberdi, in the central area of the city of Cordoba; it has a capacity of 35,000 spectators. The club occasionally uses the Estadio Mario Alberto Kempes, which has a capacity of 57,000 spectators.

History

Belgrano was founded on 19 March 1905 in Barrio Alberdi. It was named in commemoration of the Argentine historical figure Manuel Belgrano, and its colours were taken from the flag of Argentina, created by Belgrano himself. Arturo Orgaz was named as the first president.

The club settled on a land given by Ramón Moreno. Belgrano started to play friendly matches against neighboring clubs. One of them was vs. an homonymous club and the winner earned the right to keep the name. As Belgrano de Alberdi won the match 2–1, they could retain their name. In 1913 Belgrano was one of the founding members of "Nueva Federación Cordobesa de Fútbol", predecessor to "Liga Cordobesa". One year later, the team played the first "Clásico cordobés" vs. Talleres, a match held on 17 May and suspended after the players of Belgrano abandoned the field in protest at a goal scored by Talleres forward José Lascano. The Belgrano starting line up was: Ochoa; Unamúnzaga, Pacheco; Pereyra, Balbino Lascano, Lutri; Alonso, Ortega, José Lascano, Figueroa, Barabraham. Some months later, Belgrano won the clásico 8–1, which remains as the largest win between both clubs.

In 1933 the Liga Cordobesa became professional, with Belgrano winning its first title of the new era. The 1930s marked a strong supremacy of the team, winning all the championships between 1933 and 1937 with the exception of 1934 (won by Talleres). Between 1940 and 1957 Belgrano won 14 league titles, with a powerful attacking line nicknamed Quinteto de Oro. It was formed by Héctor Carrizo, Justo Coria, Oscar Mona Peralta, Dardo Lucero, and Francisco García, which is regarded as the best group of forwards in the history of football in Córdoba.

In 1938 Belgrano toured on Bolivia, winning 3 of 4 matches (1 draw), scoring 18 goals. The highlight of that tour was a 6–0 win over Club Bolívar.

Players

Current squad

Out on loan

Titles

Nacional 
 Primera Nacional (1): 2022

Regional
 Liga Cordobesa de Fútbol (28): 1913, 1914, 1917, 1919, 1920, 1929, 1930, 1931, 1932, 1933, 1935, 1936, 1937, 1940, 1946, 1947,1949, 1950, 1954, 1955, 1957, 1970, 1971, 1973, 1984, 1985, Cl 2003, 2013
 Segunda División Liga Cordobesa (3): 1908, 1909, 1910
 Unión Cordobesa de Fútbol (1): 1956
 Primera División Asociación Cordobesa (2): 1984, 1985
 Campeonato Provincial Asociación Cordobesa (3): 1983, 1984, 1985
 Torneo Regional de Córdoba (9): 1968, 1971, 1972, 1973, 1974, 1975, 1977, 1981, 1985
 Torneo del Interior (1): 1985–86
 Torneo Regional de AFA (8): 1968, 1971, 1972, 1973, 1974, 1975, 1977, 1981

References

External links

 

 
Association football clubs established in 1905
Football clubs in Córdoba Province, Argentina
1905 establishments in Argentina